Dmitry Mikhaylovich of Tver (1299 – 15 September 1326), nicknamed The Fearsome Eyes, was a Grand Prince of Tver (from 1318 to 1326) and Grand Prince of Vladimir (from 1322 to 1326). He was a son of Mikhail of Tver and Anna of Kashin.

Dmitry continued his father's fight with Grand Prince Yuri Danilovich of Moscow for the yarlik (also iarlik) that is, the diploma or patent of office for the title of Grand Prince of Vladimir, which was granted by the Khan of the Golden Horde.  The title was much desired because the Grand Prince of Vladimir was the khan's tax-collector in Rus', and as such could gain authority and real power over the other princes of Rus'.

Following Yury's machinations which led the khan to grant the yarlik to Moscow and their father's execution by the Horde in 1318, Dmitry and his brother, Alexander, fought a series of battles with Yury. They prevailed against him at the Horde, culminating in Dmitry's acquisition of the yarlik of office for the grand princely throne in 1322 and his murder of Yury at the Horde (in Sarai) three years later. Dmitry was himself arrested for the murder and executed in Sarai on the orders of Uzbeg Khan in 1326.  His remains were taken back to Tver and interred in the cathedral there.

See also
Rulers of Russia family tree

References

External links

The Grand Princes of Vladimir 

1299 births
1326 deaths
14th-century murdered monarchs
14th-century Russian princes
Grand Princes of Vladimir
Murdered Russian monarchs
Princes of Tver
Rurik dynasty
Yurievichi family
Executed Russian people
People executed for murder
14th-century executions
People executed by the Golden Horde
Eastern Orthodox monarchs